The 2009 Repco Rally Australia was the 20th Rally Australia and the tenth round of the 2009 World Rally Championship season. The rally consisted of 35 special stages and was won on the road by Citroën's Sébastien Loeb. However, Loeb's win was short-lived as his Citroën along with those of his teammate Dani Sordo, and Sébastien Ogier were given one-minute time penalties for irregularities with their cars' anti-rollbars. Ford's Mikko Hirvonen inherited the win, for his fourth win in succession.

Entries
The final entry list included 40 crews. 10 drivers contested in the World Rally Car class and 14 contested in the Production World Rally Championship class. This was the first time in the season that Petter Solberg and co-driver Phil Mills did not compete in their privately entered Citroën Xsara WRC since Rally Ireland.

Protests
The event was disrupted by environmental activists protesting against the running of the rally, claiming that the event threatened local wildlife. One week before the rally, protesters unsuccessfully filed an injunction against the event in an effort to stop it. During the rally itself, signs were placed around the route of the rally, telling the drivers and those involved in the rally to go home. The CTEK East stages, scheduled to be held on 4 September as the sixth and eleventh stages of the rally, were cancelled after rocks were thrown at the course car and the stage itself was blocked when protesters pulled a fence across the road. Early reports also emerged claiming that protesters had taken animals killed on local roads and placed them along the rally route to give the appearance that wildlife had been killed by rally cars, though these reports were later denied. Following the cancellation of the CTEK East stages, New South Wales police announced that they would prosecute those responsible as public nuisances.

Results

Special stages

Championship standings after the event

Drivers' championship

Manufacturers' championship

References

External links

Official website
Event at WRC.com

Australia
Rally Australia
Rally Australia
September 2009 sports events in Australia